Charles Remington Goldman (born 9 November 1930 in Urbana, Illinois) is an American limnologist and ecologist.

Education and career
Goldman graduated from the University of Illinois with B.A. in geology in 1952 and M.S. in zoology in 1955. He received his Ph.D. in limnology-fisheries in 1958 from the University of Michigan. From 1957 to 1958 he was a Fisheries Research Biologist with the United States Fish and Wildlife Service in Alaska. At the University of California, Davis he became in 1958 an instructor and was promoted in 1966 to full professor of zoology. There he was from 1966 to 1969, and from 1990 to 1991 he was the  founding director of the Institute of Ecology and from 1971 as Distinguished Professor of Limnology. in the Department of Environmental Science and Policy In 2010 following retirement from UC Davis he was appointed an adjunct Professor at the University of Nevada, Reno and the Desert Research Institute that had awarded him the Nevada Medal for Science in 2003.

In the mid 1960s Goldman established the Tahoe Research Group at U.C. Davis Group which would later become the Tahoe Environmental Research Center (TERC).

 He was instrumental in reestablishing the European Crayfish Industry with resistant Lake Tahoe Crayfhis following a plague of North American origin that decimated the European native crayfish stocks.  

He did environmental studies on the impacts of hydroelectric dam projects in Honduras,  Costa Rica, Argentina,Ecuador,Nigeria and Papua New Guinea.
He discovered trace element limitation of algal growth in North American and New Zealand Lakes resulting in fertilization of sockeye salmon lakes.
He developed a  gas phase calibration method for 14 Carbon productivity measurements in marine and freshwaters 
He demonstrated the importance of lake and riverside vegetation (alder trees) in providing nitrogen fertilization of streams and lakes
He mentored 101 graduate students and 37 post doctoral students while teaching from 1958 until 2010 at the University of California, Davis
He received the Diane Feinstein conservation award from the Tahoe Regional Planning Agency in 2022 for his research and environmental leadership.
 

He served as vice president of the Ecological Society of America, as president of the American Society of Limnology and Oceanography, and on many national and international committees, notably as chair of the U.S. National Committee of UNESCO's Man and the Biosphere Programme.

In 1963 he was elected a Fellow of the American Association for the Advancement of Science. Goldman has published five books and over 400 scientific articles. He has produced four educational films, including three on Lake Tahoe and one on "Research to Protect the Tropics" narrated by the late Lloyd Bridges as Vice President of Research for the Organization of Tropical Studies.

He was a Guggenheim Fellow for the academic year 1964–1965. In 1998 he received the Albert Einstein World Award of Science. U.C. Davis's Goldman-Schladow Limnology Fellowship is named in his honor through the Tahoe Environmental Research Center (TERC).

Selected publications
 with Alexander J. Horne: Limnology, McGraw Hill 1983
 as editor with James McEvoy III and Peter J. Richerson: Environmental quality and water development, Freeman, San Francisco 1973
 as editor with Michio Kumagai and Richard D. Robarts: Climatic Change and Global Warming of Inland Waters: Impacts and Mitigation for Ecosystems and Societies, Chichester, West Sussex, UK : John Wiley & Sons Inc., 2013.

References

External links

American ecologists
American limnologists
University of Illinois alumni
University of Michigan alumni
University of California, Davis faculty
Fellows of the American Association for the Advancement of Science
1930 births
Living people